Fuad Bayramov (born 30 November 1994) is an Azerbaijani football midfielder who last played for Polish club KSZO Ostrowiec Świętokrzyski.

Club career
On 19 August 2012, Bayramov made his debut in the Azerbaijan Premier League for Keşla match against Khazar Lankaran.

Honours
Keşla
Azerbaijan Cup: 2017–18

References

External links
 

1994 births
Living people
Association football midfielders
Azerbaijani footballers
Azerbaijan youth international footballers
Azerbaijan under-21 international footballers
Azerbaijani expatriate sportspeople in Georgia (country)
Expatriate footballers in Georgia (country)
Azerbaijan Premier League players
Shamakhi FK players
FC Metalurgi Rustavi players
Azerbaijani expatriate sportspeople in Poland
KSZO Ostrowiec Świętokrzyski players
Azerbaijani expatriate footballers
Expatriate footballers in Poland
III liga players